Karen Newman MRBS (born 20 January 1951) is a British-born sculptor, best known for her bronze bust of Violette Szabo on the Albert Embankment of the River Thames, outside Lambeth Palace in London.

Career
Newman was trained at the Chelsea School of Art for a Pre-Diploma 1969–1970, then on to the City and Guilds Art School in Kennington, London 1970–1972. From 1980 to 2001 Newman worked at Madame Tussauds in London. Among her subjects were:

The Duke of Edinburgh
Charlie Chaplin
The late ex-Prime Minister Harold Wilson
Sarah, Duchess of York
Stevie Wonder
Eric Clapton
Bob Geldof
Prime Minister Tony Blair
The late Israeli Prime Minister Yitzak Rabin
Jeroen Krabbé. Dutch film actor, painter.
Chancellor Helmut Kohl
Jean-Paul Gaultier
Yoko Ono
Charles Dance
Hugh Grant
Billy Connolly

Newman's life-size waxwork of Charlie Chaplin was exhibited at the National Portrait Gallery, London.

In 2008, a bronze bust of Violette Szabo was unveiled at the Albert Embankment of the River Thames, in front of Lambeth Palace.

References 

1951 births
Living people
Alumni of Chelsea College of Arts
Sculptors from London
Alumni of the City and Guilds of London Art School